Georgiana Young (née Belzer; 1924 – November 13, 2007) was an American actress and the maternal younger half-sister of actresses Loretta Young, Polly Ann Young and Sally Blane. She had a brief career in film, appearing alongside her sisters in the biographical drama The Story of Alexander Graham Bell (1939), followed by bit parts in two other films. She was the wife of Mexican actor Ricardo Montalbán from 1944 until her death.

Biography

Georgiana Young was the daughter of George Uncus Belzer and Gladys Royal. She was raised Roman Catholic, along with her half-sisters, actresses Loretta Young, Polly Ann Young and Sally Blane.  

At age thirteen, she was signed to a seven-year film contract. Her first acting role was a minor part in Mad About Music with Deanna Durbin, though her scenes were ultimately cut from the film.

Young's acting career was short-lived, though she appeared in a further three films. Her debut role was as Berta Hubbard, sister of Mabel Gardiner Hubbard, in Irving Cummings's 1939 biographical film The Story of Alexander Graham Bell, opposite her half-sisters Loretta (as Mabel), Sally and Polly Ann. She would later have bit parts in two other films: No, No, Nanette (1940) and Border Incident (1949), the latter of which starred her husband, actor Ricardo Montalbán, whom she married in 1944.

Personal life
After seeing her performance in The Story of Alexander Graham Bell (1939), 18-year-old Ricardo Montalbánwho split his time between his schooling in Los Angeles (living with his brother) and working in his father's store in Torreón, Mexicobecame enamored of the 15-year-old Young. Montalbán had started his own stage and film career when the two later met on a blind date, with Montalbán proposing that evening, later stating "It took a week to persuade her." They married in 1944, and had four children together.

Young died in 2007, at age 83.

Filmography

Notes

References

Bibliography

External links

 (incorrect birth date)

 

20th-century American actresses
2007 deaths
American film actresses
Catholics from California
21st-century American women